Will Buckingham (born 28 September 1971) is a novelist, non-fiction writer, and philosopher.

Born in Norfolk, his education includes a master's degree in anthropology from Durham (1997) and a PhD in philosophy from Staffordshire University (2007).

Buckingham held various academic posts including "Reader in Writing and Creativity" at De Montfort University, "Visiting Associate Professor" at Sichuan University, and "Visiting Professor of Global Cultures" at the Parami Institute, Yangon.

Buckingham's novels often incorporate elements of his academic interests in philosophy and anthropology. The theme of "otherness" is ever-present. This is explored in his book Stealing with the Eyes about his experience doing anthropological research in the Tanimbar Islands, Indonesia (also the setting of the novel Cargo fever). An interest in the I-Ching led him to learn Chinese, travel to China, and write a novel, 64 Pieces, that consisted of 64 short stories inspired by the 64 hexagrams. His fiction has been translated into many languages.

The children's book The Snorgh and the Sailor was shortlisted for the Coventry Inspiration Book Awards, 2013.

Buckingham is currently based in Yangon, Myanmar where he teaches creative writing.

In 2019, The Bookseller announced that Granta Books had acquired the rights for Buckingham's new novel Hello Stranger to be published in 2020.

Bibliography

Non-fiction
 Stealing with the Eyes. Haus Publishing, 2018.  
 Teach Yourself: Complete Write a Novel Course. Hodder & Stoughton, 2015.  
 Levinas, Storytelling and Anti-Storytelling. Bloomsbury Academic, 2013.  
 A Practical Guide to Happiness: Think Deeply and Flourish. Published by Icon / Totem Books in 2012.  
 The Philosophy Book. Dorling Kindersley, 2010.  
 Finding Our Sea-Legs: Ethics, Experience and the Ocean of Stories. Kingston University Press, 2009.

Fiction
 Sixty-Four Chance Pieces. Earnshaw Books, 2015.  
 Goat Music. Roman Books, 2015.   
 The Descent of the Lyre. Roman Books, 2012.  
 Cargo Fever. Tindal Street Press, 2007.

Children's Fiction
 Lucy and the Rocket Dog. Knopf, 2015/2017.   
 The Snorgh and the Sailor. Alison Green books, 2012.

References

External links
Official Website 
Wind & Bones: Writing, Creativity, Social Justice

1971 births
Living people
English non-fiction writers
21st-century English novelists
English male novelists
People from Norfolk
Alumni of Durham University
Alumni of Staffordshire University